Lucjan Kintopf (12 March 1898 – 11 December 1979) was a Polish painter. His work was part of the painting event in the art competition at the 1936 Summer Olympics.

References

1898 births
1979 deaths
20th-century Polish painters
20th-century Polish male artists
Artists from Warsaw
Olympic competitors in art competitions
Polish male painters